In differential geometry, Vermeil's theorem essentially states that the scalar curvature is the only (non-trivial) absolute invariant among those of prescribed type suitable for Albert Einstein’s theory of General Relativity. The theorem was proved by the German mathematician Hermann Vermeil in 1917.

Standard version of the theorem 
The theorem states that the Ricci scalar  is the only scalar invariant (or absolute invariant) linear in the second derivatives of the metric tensor .

See also 
Scalar curvature
Differential invariant
Einstein–Hilbert action
Lovelock's theorem

Notes

References 

Theorems in differential geometry
Invariant theory